Jonathan Gresham (born March 20, 1988) is an American professional wrestler currently signed to Impact Wrestling.  He has previously wrestled for All Elite Wrestling  (AEW) and Ring of Honor (ROH), where he is a former ROH World Champion, ROH Pure Champion, and ROH World Tag Team Champion with Jay Lethal. 

Earlier in his career, Gresham wrestled regularly on the independent circuit, in such promotions as Combat Zone Wrestling (CZW) where he is a former CZW World Heavyweight Champion as well as Chikara, IWA Mid-South, Full Impact Pro (FIP), and Evolve among others. 

He also has international experience, having wrestled in over 15 countries, including in Germany with Westside Xtreme Wrestling (wXw), and in England for Progress Wrestling, where he is a former Progress World Champion.

Early life
Joanathan Gresham was born on March 20, 1988 in Atlanta, Georgia. Gresham competed in amateur wrestling until he was 17. Some of Gresham's influences were Rey Mysterio, Hayabusa, Bam Bam Bigelow, Dean Malenko, Jushin Thunder Liger, Low Ki, The Hardy Boyz, Ikuto Hidaka and Alex Shelley among others.

Professional wrestling career

Independent circuit (2005–2019)
Gresham trained under Mr. Hughes, Jay Fury and the WWA4 wrestling school in Atlanta. His first match was in Douglasville, Georgia against Heath Miller. At the time he was only 16 years old. Gresham made his National Wrestling Alliance debut in 2006 as Jonathan Davis in a four-way tag team match losing to Darin Childs and Seth Shai. In 2007, he defeated Amien Rios in his debut match for Great Championship Wrestling in Alabama. In 2010, Gresham defeated A. R. Fox for GCW.

Gresham debuted for Booker T's Pro Wrestling Alliance in 2008 as Hero Tiger defeating Chaotix. He returned to the company in 2010 defeating Ryan Davidson to become the PWA Iron Man Championship. He once again returned to the company (now known as Reality of Wrestling) in 2014 as Jonathan Gresham. In the first round of Full Impact Pro's Jeff Peterson Memorial Cup in 2011, Gresham debuted losing to Bobby Fish. At Declaration Of Independence, Gresham successfully defended his ZERO1 International Junior Heavyweight Championship against Lince Dorado.

In 2015, Gresham made his Evolve debut losing to Matt Riddle. At Evolve 65 he lost to Catch Point. Gresham defeated Drastik Boy to win Desastre Total Ultraviolento's Alto Rendimiento title at Coyotes Hambrientos in 2015. He lost the championship to Kim Ray on a Westside Xtreme Wrestling tour.

Gresham debuted for International Wrestling Cartel in 2016 in the Super Indy 15 tournament making it to the finals only to be eliminated by Josh Alexander. At Reloaded 3.0, Gresham won a four-way Super Indy 16 qualifying match. Gresham later won the IWC Super Indy title in June 2017 by defeating Chris LeRusso in the Super Indy 16 tournament in the semi-final only to lose it to Adam Cole in the finals.

Gresham defeated Tracy Williams at Beyond Wrestling's Battle Of Who Could Care Less. Gresham beat Zack Sabre Jr. at Beyond Ripped Off In The Prime Of Life. The following month he defeated Sabre once again at Flesh. This led to a two out of three falls match between the two later that month at Americanrana 2016. Gresham defeated Sabre by pinning him twice. At Americanrana 2017, Gresham defeated Brian Cage. Gresham defeated Joey Lynch to become the inaugural Independent champion in October 2017. He successfully defended the title at Wazzup against Nick Gage. Gresham lost the Independent championship to Tracy Williams in a three-way elimination match at Beyond Abbondanza.

Chikara (2010–2012)

Gresham made his Chikara debut in 2010 teaming with The Osirian Portal and defeating Bruderschaft des Kreuzes (Lince Dorado, Delirious and Pinkie Sanchez). In January 2011, Gresham now as Hieracon and now part of the Osirian Portal stable defeated Team F.I.S.T (Johnny Gargano, Icarus and Chuck Taylor). The group disbanded after Amasis retired. Ophidian attacked Amasis and unmasked him, turning rudo (heel). Gresham's last match in Chikara was a loss to Ophidian. After the match Ophidian took Hieracon's mask.

Combat Zone Wrestling (2010–2017)
Gresham debut for Combat Zone Wrestling in 2010 at CZW Fist Fight. Gresham picked up his first win against Greg Excellent in November 2010. Gresham won Best of the Best 15 after defeating David Starr. At Down With The Sickness 2016, Gresham won the CZW World Heavyweight Championship for the first time. At Cage of Death 18, Gresham lost the CZW World Heavyweight Championship to Joe Gacy thus ending his reign.

Westside Xtreme Wrestling (2011–2015, 2022)
Gresham debuted for Westside Xtreme Wrestling in 2011 winning against Bernd Föhr in the first round of the Chase The Mahamla Tournament. He would make it to the semi final only to lose to Shinya Ishikawa. At wXw Payback 5, Gresham alongside Jay Skillet challenged the Sumerian Death Squad (Michael Dante and Tommy End) for the wXw World Tag Team Championship in a losing effort. Gresham and Skillet formed RockSkillet in 2012. In August 2012, RockSkillet defeated Dante and End in a two out of three falls match to become wXw World Tag Team Champions for the first time as well as ending Dante and End's record breaking reign. At Fight Club 2012, RockSkillet defeated OI4K. RockSkillet defeated The Young Bucks at wXw Back To The Roots XII. In March 2013, RockSkillet lost the wXw World Tag Team Championship to AUTsiders (Big van Walter and Robert Dreissker).

Gresham won the 2022 edition of 16 Carat Gold Tournament by defeating Dreissker in the finals.

Pro Wrestling Zero1 and affiliates (2012–2017)
Gresham debuted for Pro Wrestling Zero1 at Beach Pro Wrestling ~ Chapter 5. Gresham defeated Oliver Cain for the Zero1 USA Midwest X-Division Championship in a cage match at Zero1 USA Supreme in 2013.

Gresham made his return to Zero1 USA Supreme in 2017 to take part in the Zero1 USA Tenkaichi Junior Tournament. Gresham made it to the finals only to lose to Joey O'Riley.

Ring of Honor (2011, 2014–2022) / All Elite Wrestling (2022)

Early appearances (2011–2015)
Gresham made his Ring of Honor debut against Kyle O'Reilly in 2011 in the Top Prospect Tournament.

He returned in 2014 losing to Will Ferrara in a dark match.

In 2015, Gresham returned to Ring Of Honor at the Winter Warriors tour. In December 2015, he defeated Cedric Alexander.

Search and Destroy (2017–2020)
In 2017, it was announced that Ring of Honor had signed Gresham to a contract. In April 2017, Gresham teamed with Chris Sabin where they defeated Cheeseburger and Will Ferrara. Gresham, along with Jay White, Chris Sabin and Alex Shelley formed Search and Destroy. On June 24, Gresham defeated Flip Gordon. At Best in the World, Search and Destroy defeated the Rebellion (Rhett Titus, Kenny King, Shane Taylor and Caprice Coleman) were the losing team must disband. Gresham took part of the Honor Rumble in 2017. On the September 9th, 2017 episode of Ring Of Honor, Search and Destroy defeated The Bullet Club. At Final Battle, Gresham defeated Josh Woods in a pre-show dark match. Gresham then went on to lose to Jay Lethal at Honor Reigns Supreme and to Chuckie T at Supercard of Honor XII. At Final Battle in 2019, Gresham teamed with Jay Lethal to defeat The Briscoe Brothers to win the ROH World Tag Team Championship.

ROH Pure Champion and ROH World Champion (2020–2022)
For most of 2020, Gresham was inactive, as ROH had taken an extended hiatus due to the COVID-19 pandemic, but when ROH resumed in August 2020, Gresham became part of a 16-man tournament to crown a new ROH Pure Champion, a title that was being revived after being retired 14 years earlier. Gresham would go on to win the tournament, defeating Tracy Williams in the finals on August 23 (airing on October 31) to win the title and become a double champion in ROH. On the November 28th, 2020 episode of Ring of Honor Wrestling, Gresham appeared with "Hot Sauce" Tracy Williams, Jay Lethal and Rhett Titus as the newly formed faction The Foundation.

In September 2021, Gresham lost the Pure Championship to Josh Woods at Death Before Dishonor XVIII. Gresham would then go on to win the vacant ROH World Championship by defeating Jay Lethal at Final Battle.

On April 1, 2022,  at Supercard of Honor XV, Gresham defeated Bandido to become the undisputed ROH World Champion. On the July 8 episode of AEW Rampage, Gresham turned heel on Lee Moriarty aligning himself with the Tully Blanchard Enterprises. This partnership proved to be short-lived as on the Zero Hour before Death Before Dishonor, Prince Nana announced he purchased all of Tully Blanchard Enterprises from Tully. In the opening match, Gresham lost his ROH championship to Claudio Castagnoli. A few hours prior to the event, Gresham requested a release from his AEW/ROH contract.

Impact Wrestling (2022–present) 
In 2016, Gresham made an appearance at One Night Only: X-Travaganza, an event held by Total Nonstop Action Wrestling (TNA). At the event, he lost to DJZ. He later portrayed Suicide, defeating David Starr on the same night. On December 23, 2021, it was announced by Impact Wrestling that Gresham would defend the ROH World Championship at Hard To Kill against Chris Sabin, who has been owed a ROH World Championship match since 2018. Gresham retained the title over Sabin at the event, and then defeated Steve Maclin two weeks later. On December 16, 2022, It was announced that Gresham had officially signed with IMPACT Wrestling.

On the December 15, 2022 episode of Impact!, Gresham made his return to Impact Wrestling, saving Delirious from an attack by Eddie Edwards. It was later confirmed that Gresham signed with Impact. On January 13, 2023, at Hard To Kill, Gresham was defeated by Edwards.

PROGRESS Wrestling (2022-present)
In March 2022, Gresham challenged Cara Noir for the Progress Wrestling World Championship at Chapter 130. Gresham won the match and the championship after interference from Spike Trivet. After Chapter 134, Gresham was stripped of the Progress World Championship following a defence against Gene Munny in a match with the stipulation that Gresham would lose the championship if Lykos Gym (Kid Lykos & Kid Lykos II) interfered, which they did.

Personal life
In December 2018, Gresham got engaged to fellow professional wrestler, Jordynne Grace. The couple married in September 2020.

Championships and accomplishments 
 Combat Zone Wrestling
 Best of the Best XV (2016)
 CZW World Heavyweight Championship (1 time)
 The Crash Lucha Libre
 The Crash Cruiserweight Championship (1 time)
 Desastre Total Ultraviolento
 DTU Alto Impacto Championship (1 time)
 IndependentWrestling.TV
 Independent Wrestling Championship (1 time)
 International Wrestling Cartel
 IWC Super Indy Championship (1 time)
 Super Indy 17 (2018)
 N'Catch
 Super N'Cup (2011)
 National Wrestling Alliance
 NWA Mid-America X Division Championship (1 time)
 New South Pro Wrestling
 NSPW Heavyweight Championship (1 time)
 Powerbomb.tv
 Independent Championship (1 time)
 Independent Championship Tournament (2017) 
 Progress Wrestling
 Progress Unified World Championship (1 time)
 Pro Wrestling Zero1
 International Junior Heavyweight Championship (1 time)
 New Wrestling Alliance World Junior Heavyweight Championship (1 time)
 Zero1 USA Midwest X Division Championship/World Junior Heavyweight Championship (1 time)
 Tenkaichi Jr. Tournament (2012)
 Pro Wrestling Alliance
 PWA Heavyweight Championship (1 time)
 PWA Iron Man Championship (1 time)
 Pure Xtremely Brutal Wrestling Entertainment
 PXBWE Tag Team Championship (1 time) – with Tim Donst
 Pro Wrestling Illustrated
 Ranked No. 10 of the top 500 singles wrestlers in the PWI 500 in 2022
 Ring of Honor
 ROH Pure Championship (1 time)
 ROH World Championship (1 time)
 ROH World Tag Team Championship (1 time) – with Jay Lethal
 ROH Pure Championship Tournament (2020)
 ROH Year-End Award (5 times)
 Tag Team of the Year (2020) – 
 Faction of the Year (2020) – 
 Match of the Year (2020) – 
 Wrestler of the Year (2020)
Wrestler of the Year (2021)
 Sixth Triple Crown Champion
 Sports Illustrated
 Ranked No. 10 of the top 10 wrestlers in 2021
 Westside Xtreme Wrestling
 wXw World Tag Team Championship (1 time) – with Jay Skillet
16 Carat Gold Tournament|wXw 16 Carat Gold Tournament (2022)
 WWA4 Wrestling School
 WWA4 Heavyweight Championship (1 time)
 WWA4 Internet Championship (1 time)
 WWA4 Tag Team Championship (1 time) – with Ric King

References

External links
 
 
 
 
 

1988 births
Living people
American male professional wrestlers
American male sport wrestlers
African-American male professional wrestlers
ROH World Champions
ROH Pure Champions
21st-century African-American sportspeople
21st-century African-American people
21st-century professional wrestlers
ROH World Tag Team Champions
CZW World Heavyweight Champions
PROGRESS World Champions
PROGRESS Tag Team Champions